The 1910 Trinity Bantams football team represented the Trinity College during the 1910 college football season. The team suffered its only loss to Army.

Schedule

References

Trinity
Trinity Bantams football seasons
Trinity Bantams football